George Washington Middle School can refer to:

George Washington Middle School (Texas)
George Washington Middle School (Virginia)
George Washington Middle School (New Jersey)

See also
Washington Middle School (disambiguation)